Khalwa (also khalwat; lit., "solitude"; pronounced in Iran, "khalvat"; spelling in Turkish, halvet) has several meanings in Sufism, Islamic jurisprudence, and the Druze religion, which in some way derive from the concept of being alone or withdrawing from the world.

Sufism 

 
In Sufism, a solitary retreat, traditionally for forty days, during which a disciple does extensive spiritual exercises under the direction of a shaykh.

A Sufi murid will enter the khalwa spiritual retreat under the direction of a shaykh for a given period, sometimes for as long as 40 days, emerging only for salah (daily prayers) and, usually, to discuss dreams, visions and live with the shaykh. Once a major element of Sufi practice, khalwa has become less frequent in recent years.

It is the act of total self-abandonment in desire for the Divine Presence. In complete seclusion, the Sufi continuously repeats the name of God as a highest form of dhikr, remembrance of God. Then, "Almighty God will spread before him the degrees of the kingdom as a test".

Other Sufi uses include:
 A religious school is known as "a khalwa" in Sudanese Arabic. This reflects the former dominance of Sufism in the Sudan.
 The Khalwati order (Halveti) of Sufism derives its name from the term "khalwa".

In Islamic jurisprudence 
In Islamic jurisprudence, it is a state in which two people, male and female, are alone and, if unmarried, it is a state from which they ought to remove themselves. For example, in Malaysia in 2009, 197 students "were caught for khalwat" in the state of Kuala Terengganu within seven months. Muslims there who are unmarried, non-relatives of a person of the opposite sex can be apprehended by state religious police under the offence of khalwat (being in "close proximity" as The Star Online described it). Religious Department enforcement officers can conduct "checks, surveillance and raids to curtail khalwat cases," catch "students from secondary schools and higher learning institutes...for khalwat" and advise "youth organisations and student leaders on the bane of committing khalwat."

The prohibition of khalwa in Islam is comparable to that of in Judaism of the equivalent concept of yichud.

In architecture
The underground prayer chamber in the traditional mosques of central Arabia (Najd) is termed a khālwa.

Among the Druze, a prayer house is known as Khalwa.

See also 
 The White Days

References 

Islamic practices
Islamic terminology
Khalwati order